Teaser may refer to:

 One who teases
 Cold open, a segment at the beginning of a television program or film before the opening credits
 Teaser (trailer), a advertising method specifically focused in film and television (including theatrical trailers). It is a teaser campaign method.
 Teaser campaign is a broad term used to refer to an abridged promotion that leaves the receiver with lots of questions in order to build anticipation. 
 Teaser (animal), a male livestock animal (typically a bull) whose penis has been amputated

Popular culture
 The Teaser (1925 film), directed by William A. Seiter and starring Laura La Plante and Pat O'Malley

Music 
 Teaser (Tommy Bolin album)
 Teaser (Angela Bofill album)
 "Teaser" (George Benson song)
 "Teaser",  a song by Kardinal Offishall
 "Teaser", a song by the Brothers Johnson from Winners

Other
 Teaser (gambling), a type of gambling bet that allows the bettor to combine bets on two different games
 Brain teaser, a puzzle
 , more than one United States Navy ship
 Teaser (sternwheeler), a steamboat that ran on the Columbia River and Puget Sound from 1874 to 1880

See also
 , various ships of the British Royal Navy
 Teazer (disambiguation)
 
 
 Tease (disambiguation)